General elections were held in Greenland in April 1983. Siumut and Atassut both won 12 seats in the 26-seat Parliament.

Results

References

Elections in Greenland
Greenland
1983 in Greenland